This article chronologically lists players who have captained the senior Kerry county football team in the Munster Senior Football Championship and the All-Ireland Senior Football Championship. If a player captained Kerry in multiple games in a year but that captaincy was broken by an absence from the starting line up, then there will be separate entries for that player for that year.

The list is confined to players who started games as captain, it does not list players that were nominated as county captain but did not command a starting place. Unlike other counties the captain is chosen from the club that has won the Kerry Senior Football Championship.

Players indicated in bold are All-Ireland winning captains.

2022: Joe O'Connor Seán O'Shea
2021: Paul Murphy
2020: David Clifford  2019: Gavin White  2018: Shane Murphy  2017: Fionn Fitzgerald and Johnny Buckley

List of captains

References

Captains
 
Kerry